Han may refer to:

Ethnic groups 
 Han Chinese, or Han People: the name for the largest ethnic group in China, which also constitutes the world's largest ethnic group.   
 Han Taiwanese: the name for the ethnic group of the Taiwanese people who may be fully or partially Han Chinese descent. 
 Han Minjok, or Han people: the Korean native name referring to Koreans. 
 Hän: one of the First Nations peoples of Canada.

Former states  
 Han (Western Zhou state) (韓) (11th century BC – 757 BC), a Chinese state during the Spring and Autumn period
 Han (state) (韓) (403–230  BC), a Chinese state during the Warring States period
 Han dynasty (漢/汉) (206 BC – 220 AD), a dynasty split into two eras, Western Han and Eastern Han
 Shu Han (蜀漢) (221–263), a Han Chinese dynasty that existed during the Three Kingdoms Period
 Former Zhao (304–329), one of the Sixteen Kingdoms, known as Han (漢) before 319
 Cheng Han (成漢) (304–347), one of the Sixteen Kingdoms, known as Han (漢) after 338
 Hou Han (侯漢) (552), dynasty name used by Hou Jing during his brief usurpation of the Liang dynasty
 Former Shu (前蜀) (907–925), a state during the Five Dynasties and Ten Kingdoms period, known as Han (漢) between 917 and 918
 Southern Han (南漢) (917–971), a state during the Five Dynasties and Ten Kingdoms period
 Later Han (Five Dynasties) (後漢) (947–951), a state during the Five Dynasties and Ten Kingdoms period
 Northern Han (北漢)(951–979), successor to Later Han, also during the Five Dynasties and Ten Kingdoms period
 Chen Han (漢) (1360–1364), an insurgent middle Yangtze state in the late Yuan Dynasty
 Samhan, three ancient confederacies in the southern Korean Peninsula; also refers to the Three Kingdoms of Korea
 Byeonhan confederacy
 Jinhan confederacy
 Mahan confederacy
 Daehan Jaeguk or Korean Empire (1897–1910), the last monarchial kingdom of Korea.

Modern places 
 Daehan Minguk, the South Korean name for Republic of Korea.
 Hanguk, the Korean name for Korea, often referring to the country South Korea. 
 Han-sur-Lesse, Rochefort, Belgium
 Han-sur-Meuse, Meuse, France
 Han-devant-Pierrepont in Meurthe-et-Moselle, France
 Han-sur-Nied in Moselle, France
 Han, Iran, a village in Sistan and Baluchestan Province
 Han, Eskişehir, Turkey

Arts, entertainment, and media
 Han Solo, a character in the Star Wars franchise
 Han Lue, a character in the Fast & Furious franchise
 The Airlords of Han, the sequel to Armageddon 2419 A.D.
 "Han", a fifth season episode of The West Wing

Names
 Han (name), a given name and surname
 Han (Chinese surname), also Haan, Hahn or Hann, the Romanized spelling of many Chinese family names: 漢, 韓(韩), 邗, 罕, 寒, 憨, etc.
 Han (Korean surname), (한, 韓 or 漢), also romanized as "Hahn"

Education
 Han school, Japan, Edo period
 HAN University of Applied Sciences, in the Netherlands

Languages 
 Hän language, an indigenous language of North America
 Han Chinese language, or just Chinese
 Korean language (한국어 Hangug-eo), as known in South Korea
 Han languages, a group of languages of ancient Korea
 Han, the ISO 639-3 code for the Hangaza language of Tanzania

Writing systems 
 Hán, used in Vietnamese orthography
 Han characters (漢字, Pinyin: Hanzi, often referred to as Chinese characters)
 Han unification (Han character glyph unification) in Unicode 
 Hangul (한글 Hangeul), the Korean alphabet
 Hanja (한자, 漢字), Han characters used for the Korean language

Other 
 Hän, a Finnish 3rd person pronoun

Transportation
 Hanwell railway station, in England
 Hindaun City railway station, in India
 Noi Bai International Airport, serving Hanoi, Vietnam
 BYD Han (汉), a Chinese passenger car

Other uses
 Khan (title), or Han (汗) in Chinese transliteration, originally Central Asian title for a sovereign or military ruler
 Han system (藩), a term for feudal clan or fief in Japan
 Han (cultural), a Korean cultural concept of lament
 Han (inn), also spelled khan, caravanserai
 Han (trilobite), a monotypic genus
 Han Vodka
 Health Alert Network of US CDC
 Home network in computing
 Hospitality Association of Namibia
 Hydroxylammonium nitrate
 Type 091 submarine, Chinese nuclear submarine class

See also 
 Hahn (disambiguation)
 Han River (disambiguation)
 Hans (disambiguation)